released as Boot Camp in North America, is a 1987 arcade video game produced by Konami. The player takes control of a military recruit who is undergoing basic training at a United States Marine Corps Recruit Training camp, also known as a boot camp. The arcade game uses trackball controls.

In 1987, Ocean Software released ports of the game for the Commodore 64, ZX Spectrum, and Amstrad CPC in Europe. Konami themselves later released the Commodore 64 version in North America under the Boot Camp title in 1989 alongside an MS-DOS version. An Amiga version was announced, but never released.

Gameplay
The control panel consists of a trackball and two buttons with different functions depending on the event. The game can be played against a CPU-controlled opponent or a second player. Player 1 takes control of Nick, a brown-haired recruit in an orange shirt, while Player 2 is Joe, a blond-haired recruit in a blue shirt.

The game is composed of seven training events whom the player must complete. Upon a near-success failure to complete an event (failing too severely results in game over), the player must do a set number of chin ups as punishment (this chance is given only once) in order to continue into the succeeding events, or it's game over. The events are as follows:

 Obstacle Course – Set in a side-scrolling segment, the player must reach the end of the stage under the allotted time while climbing walls and clearing bars. Losing to the CPU or to one another does not mean game over as long as the players cross the finish line within the allotted time.
 Shooting Range No. 1 – The player must shoot as many targets as possible under the allotted time. If played against a second player, then the one who shoots the most targets win.
 Iron Man Race – Similar to the obstacle course, but set in a top view angle. The player must reach the goal while avoiding mines and other obstacles. Eventually the player must cross a lake by either swimming or rowing a boat. Losing to the CPU or to one another does not mean game over as long as the players cross the finish line within the allotted time.
 Shooting Range No. 2 – Same as the first one, but now with moving targets.
 Arm Wrestling – The two recruits are pitted against each other in a match of strength and stamina. This is more like a bonus stage than an actual course: the player is not penalized for losing. 
 Shooting Range No. 3 – The third and final shooting range stage features penalty targets.
 Fighting – The player faces his instructor in hand-to-hand combat in the final event. There is no make-up punishment in this event; if a player loses, it is game over no matter what. If played with a second player, then the two players must fight each other. Only the victor is allowed to graduate.

After all seven events are cleared, the player graduates from basic training only to be sent on a mission (the 8th and final stage) to rescue the U.S. President from armed terrorists. The final stage consists of a single side-scrolling level where the player must fight off terrorists using all the skills acquired during the course of training. This stage can only be played by one player. Without a continue feature or spare stocks of lives, and because the player dies with one hit (minus the part that pits the player in a hand-to-hand combat against the terrorist leader) from anything, the final stage is extremely difficult to clear.

Reception and legacy 
In Japan, Game Machine listed Combat School on their July 1, 1987 issue as being the fourth most-successful table arcade unit of the month.

Your Sinclair magazine gave the arcade game a positive review, comparing "Konami's new military arcade game" favorably with Konami's earlier Olympic video game Hyper Sports (1984).

Cabal, released several months later, had similar trackball controls to Combat School.

Notes

References

External links
 Combat School at ysrnry.co.uk
 Combat School flyer

1987 video games
Arcade video games
Amstrad CPC games
Commodore 64 games
Konami games
Konami arcade games
Ocean Software games
School-themed video games
Trackball video games
Video games about the United States Marine Corps
Video games scored by David Whittaker
Video games scored by Martin Galway
Video games set in the United States
ZX Spectrum games
Video games developed in Japan